Sri Lanka competed at the 2019 World Championships in Athletics in Doha, Qatar, from 27 September to 6 October 2019. Hiruni Kesara Wijayaratne was the only athlete representing Sri Lanka, in the women's marathon event.

Hiruni Wijayaratne left the marathon race halfway at 22km citing heat stroke and high temperature.

Results

Women 

 Track and road events

References 

Nations at the 2019 World Athletics Championships
World Championships in Athletics
2019